Francis Finlay is the name of:

Frank Finlay (1926–2016), actor
Francis Dalzell Finlay (1793–1857), Irish journalist

See also
Frank Finlay (cricketer) (1868–1947), Irish cricketer
Francis Finley (1882–?), rugby player
Frank Findlay (1884–1945), New Zealand politician of the National Party